The Hundred of Perlubie is a hundred within County of Dufferin, South Australia and was proclaimed in 1895.

The traditional owners of the land are the Wirangu peoples.

See also
Lands administrative divisions of South Australia

References

Perlubie